Nadia Elena Comăneci Conner (born November 12, 1961) is a Romanian retired gymnast and a five-time Olympic gold medalist, all in individual events. In 1976, at the age of 14, Comăneci was the first gymnast to be awarded a perfect score of 10.0 at the Olympic Games. At the same Games (1976 Summer Olympics in Montreal) she received six more perfect 10s for events en route to winning three gold medals. At the 1980 Summer Olympics in Moscow Comăneci won two more gold medals and achieved two more perfect 10s. During her career Comăneci won nine Olympic medals and four World Artistic Gymnastics Championship medals.

One of the world's best-known gymnasts, Comăneci, along with Olga Korbut of the Soviet Union, displayed artistry and grace, which brought unprecedented global popularity to the sport in the mid-1970s. In 2000, Comăneci was named one of the Athletes of the 20th Century by the Laureus World Sports Academy. She has lived in the United States since 1989, when she defected from then-Communist Romania before its revolution in December that year. She later worked with and married American Olympic gold-medal gymnast Bart Conner, who set up his own school.

Early life 

Nadia Elena Comăneci was born on November 12, 1961, in Onești, a small town in the Carpathian Mountains, in Bacău County, Romania, in the historical region of Western Moldavia. She was born to Gheorghe (1936–2012) and Ștefania Comăneci, and has a younger brother. Her parents separated in the 1970s and her father later moved to Bucharest, the capital. She and her brother, Adrian, were raised in the Romanian Orthodox Church. In a 2011 interview Nadia's mother said that she enrolled her daughter into gymnastics classes because as a child she was so full of energy and active that she was difficult to manage. After years of top-level athletic competition Comăneci graduated from Politehnica University of Bucharest with a degree in sports education, which qualified her to coach gymnastics.

Early gymnastics career 

Comăneci began gymnastics in kindergarten with a local team called Flacăra ("The Flame"), with coaches Duncan and Munteanu. At age 6, she was chosen to attend Béla Károlyi's experimental gymnastics school after Károlyi spotted her and a friend turning cartwheels in a schoolyard. Károlyi was looking for gymnasts he could train from a young age. When recess ended, the girls quickly went inside and Károlyi went around the classrooms trying to find them; he eventually spotted Comăneci. (The other girl, Viorica Dumitru, developed in a different direction and became one of Romania's top ballerinas.)

By 1968, when she was seven, Comăneci started training with Károlyi. She was one of the first students at the gymnastics school established in Onești by Béla and his wife, Márta. As a resident of the town, Comăneci was able to live at home for many years; most of the other students boarded at the school.

In 1970 Comăneci began competing as a member of her home town team and, at age nine, became the youngest gymnast ever to win the Romanian Nationals. In 1971 she participated in her first international competition, a dual junior meet between Romania and Yugoslavia, winning her first all-around title and contributing to the team gold. For the next few years she competed as a junior in numerous national contests in Romania and dual meets with countries such as Hungary, Italy and Poland. At the age of 11, in 1973, she won the all-around gold, as well as the vault and uneven bars titles, at the Junior Friendship Tournament (Druzhba), an important international meet for junior gymnasts.

Comăneci's first major international success came at the age of 13, when she nearly swept the board at the 1975 European Women's Artistic Gymnastics Championships in Skien, Norway. She won the all-around and gold medals in every event but the floor exercise, in which she was placed second. She continued to enjoy success that year, winning the all-around at the ‘Champions All’ competition and coming first in the all-around, vault, beam and bars at the Romanian National Championships. In the pre-Olympic test event in Montreal Comăneci won the all-around and the balance beam golds as well as silvers in the vault, floor and bars. Accomplished Soviet gymnast Nellie Kim won the golds in those events and was one of Comăneci's greatest rivals for the next five years.

1976

American Cup

In March 1976, Comăneci competed in the inaugural edition of the American Cup at Madison Square Garden in Manhattan. She received rare scores of 10, which signified a perfect routine without any deductions, for her vault in the preliminary stage and for her floor exercise routine in the final of the all-around competition, which she won. During this competition, Comăneci met American gymnast Bart Conner for the first time. While he remembered this meeting, Comăneci noted in her memoirs that she had to be reminded of it later in life. She was 14 and Conner was celebrating his 18th birthday. They both won a silver cup and were photographed together. A few months later, they participated in the 1976 Summer Olympics that Comăneci dominated, while Conner was a marginal figure. Conner later said, "Nobody knew me, and [Comăneci] certainly didn't pay attention to me."

Summer Olympics in Montreal

On July 18, 1976, Comăneci made history at the Montreal Olympics. During the team compulsory portion of the competition, she was awarded the first perfect 10 in Olympic gymnastics for her routine on the uneven bars. Omega SA, the official Olympics scoreboard manufacturer, had been led to believe that competitors could not receive a perfect ten, and had not programmed the scoreboard to display this score. Comăneci's perfect 10 thus appeared as "1.00," the only means by which the judges could indicate that she had received a 10.

During the remainder of the Montreal Games, Comăneci earned six additional "10s". She won gold medals for the individual all-around, the balance beam and uneven bars. She also won a bronze for the floor exercise and a silver as part of the team all-around. Soviet gymnast Nellie Kim was her main rival during the Montreal Olympics; Kim became the second gymnast to receive a perfect ten, in her case for her performance on the vault.  Comăneci took over the media spotlight from gymnast Olga Korbut, who had been the darling of the 1972 Munich Games.

Comăneci was the first Romanian gymnast to win the Olympic all-around title. She also holds the record as the youngest ever Olympic gymnastics all-around champion  at age 14. The sport has since raised its age-eligibility requirements so that gymnasts must be at least 16 in the same calendar year of the Olympics in order to compete. When Comăneci competed in 1976, gymnasts had only to be 14 by the first day of the competition. Unless the age of eligibility is lowered, Comăneci's record cannot be broken.

She was ranked as the BBC Overseas Sports Personality of the Year for 1976 and the Associated Press's 1976 "Female Athlete of the Year". Back home in Romania, Comăneci was awarded the Sickle and Hammer Gold Medal for her success, and she was named a Hero of Socialist Labor. She was the youngest Romanian to receive such recognition during the administration of Nicolae Ceaușescu.

"Nadia's Theme"
"Nadia's Theme" refers to an instrumental piece that became linked to Comăneci shortly after the 1976 Olympics. It was part of the musical score of the 1971 film Bless the Beasts and Children and originally titled "Cotton's Dream". It was also used as the title theme music for the American soap opera The Young and the Restless.

Robert Riger used it in association with slow-motion montages of Comăneci on the television program ABC's Wide World Of Sports. The song became a top-10 single in the fall of 1976, and composers Barry De Vorzon and Perry Botkin Jr. renamed it as "Nadia's Theme" in Comăneci's honor. Comăneci never performed to "Nadia's Theme", however. Her floor exercise music was a medley of the songs "Yes Sir, That's My Baby" and "Jump in the Line," arranged for piano.

1977–1979
Comăneci successfully defended her European all-around title at the championship competition in 1977. When questions were raised at the competition about the scoring, Ceaușescu ordered the Romanian gymnasts to return home. The team followed orders amid controversy and walked out of the competition during the event finals.

Following the 1977 Europeans, the Romanian Gymnastics Federation removed Comăneci from her longtime coaches, the Károlyis, and sent her to Bucharest on August 23 to train at the sports complex. She did not find this change positive and was struggling with bodily changes as she grew older. Her gymnastics skills suffered, and she was unhappy to the point of losing the desire to live. After surviving a suicide attempt, Comăneci competed in the 1978 World Championships in Strasbourg "seven inches taller and a stone and a half [21 pounds] heavier" than she was in the 1976 Olympics. A fall from the uneven bars resulted in a fourth-place finish in the all-around behind Soviets Elena Mukhina, Nellie Kim, and Natalia Shaposhnikova. Comăneci did win the world title on beam, and a silver on vault.

After the 1978 "Worlds", Comăneci was permitted to return to Deva and the Károlyis' school. In 1979, Comăneci won her third consecutive European all-around title, becoming the first gymnast, male or female, to achieve this feat. At the World Championships in Fort Worth that December, Comăneci led the field after the compulsory competition. She was hospitalized before the optional portion of the team competition for blood poisoning, which had resulted from a cut in her wrist from her metal grip buckle. Against doctors' orders, she left the hospital and competed on the beam, where she scored a 9.95. Her performance helped give the Romanians their first team gold medal. After her performance, Comăneci spent several days recovering in All Saints Hospital. She had to undergo a minor surgical procedure for the infected hand, which had developed an abscess.

1980–1984

1980 Summer Olympics

Comăneci was chosen to participate in the 1980 Summer Olympics in Moscow. As a result of the Soviet invasion of Afghanistan, President Jimmy Carter declared that the United States would boycott the Olympics (several other countries also participated in the boycott, though their reasons varied). According to Comăneci, the Romanian government "touted the 1980 Olympic games as the first all-Communist Games." However, she also noted in her memoir, "in Moscow, we walked into the mouth of a lion's den; it was the Russians' home turf." She won two gold medals, one for the balance beam and one for the floor exercise (in which she tied with Soviet gymnast Nellie Kim, against whom she had also competed in the 1976 Montreal Olympics and other events). She also won two silver medals, one for the team all-around and one for individual all-around. Controversies arose concerning the scoring in the all-around and floor exercise competitions. As of the 2020 Summer Games, she is the only gymnast to defend her Olympic gold medal in the balance beam apparatus.

Her coach, Bela Károlyi, protested that she was scored unfairly. His protests were captured on television. According to Comăneci's memoir, the Romanian government was upset about Károlyi's public behavior, feeling that he had humiliated them. Life became very difficult for Károlyi from that point on.

"Nadia '81"

In 1981, the Gymnastics Federation contacted Comăneci and informed her that she would be part of an official tour of the United States named "Nadia '81" and her coaches Béla and Márta Károlyi would lead the group. During this tour, Comăneci's team shared a bus trip with American gymnasts; it was the third time she had encountered Bart Conner. They had earlier met in 1976. She later remembered thinking, "Conner was cute. He bounced around the bus talking to everyone—he was incredibly friendly and fun."

Her coaches Béla and Márta Károlyi defected on the last day of the tour, along with the Romanian team choreographer Géza Pozsár. Prior to defecting, Károlyi hinted a few times to Comăneci that he might attempt to do so and indirectly asked if she wanted to join him. At that time, she had no interest in defecting, and said she wanted to go home to Romania. After the defection of the Károlyis, life changed drastically for Comăneci in Romania, as she could not have predicted. Officials feared that she would also defect. Feeling she was a national asset, they strictly monitored her actions, refusing to allow her to travel outside the country.

1984 Summer Olympics
The government did allow Comăneci to participate in the 1984 Summer Olympics in Los Angeles as part of the Romanian delegation. Although a number of Communist nations boycotted the 1984 Summer Olympics in a tit-for-tat against the U.S.-led boycott of the Olympics in Moscow four years before, Romania chose to participate. Comăneci later wrote in her memoir that many believed Romania went to the Olympics because an agreement had been made with the United States not to accept defectors. But Comăneci did not participate in the Games as a member of the Romanian team; she served as an observer. She was able to see Károlyi's new protégé, American gymnast Mary Lou Retton, who won five medals including one gold. The Romanian delegation did not allow her to talk with Károlyi and closely watched her the entire time.

1984–1990

The Romanian government continued to restrict Comăneci from leaving Romania, aside from a few select trips to Moscow and Cuba. She had started thinking about retiring a few years earlier, but her official retirement ceremony took place in Bucharest in 1984. It was attended by the chairman of the International Olympic Committee.

Comăneci later wrote in her memoir:
Life took on a new bleakness. I was cut off from making the small amount of extra money that had really made a difference in my family's life. It was also insulting that a normal person in Romania had the chance to travel, whereas I could not…. when my gymnastics career was over, there was no longer any need to keep me happy. I was to do as I was instructed, just as I'd done my entire life…. If Bela hadn't defected, I would still have been watched, but his defection brought a spotlight on my life, and it was blinding. I started to feel like a prisoner.

On the night of November 27, 1989, a few weeks before the Romanian Revolution, Comăneci defected with a group of other Romanians, crossing the Hungary–Romania border around Cenad. They were guided by Constantin Panait, a Romanian who later became an American citizen after defecting. Their journey was mostly on foot and at night. They traveled through Hungary and Austria and finally were able to take a plane to the United States.

1990–present

Comăneci moved to Oklahoma in 1991 to help her friend Bart Conner, another Olympic gold medalist, with his gymnastics school. She lived with the family of Paul Ziert and eventually hired him as her manager. Comăneci and Conner initially were just friends. They were together for four years before they became engaged.

For every year since 1994, the Nadia Comăneci International Invitational has welcomed gymnasts ranging from USAG level 4 to level 10. The competition has also hosted international elite competition in the mid-2010s, with Rebeca Andrade being a notable attendee in 2013 among others.

She returned to Romania for their 1996 wedding, which was held in Bucharest. This was after the fall of the Communist regime and the establishment of a capitalist Romania; the government welcomed her as a national hero. The wedding was televised live throughout Romania, and the couple's reception was held in the former presidential palace.

On May 18, 1997, Nadia Comaneci and Bart Conner guest-starred on the Season 3 finale of Touched by an Angel where they performed a brief floor exercise within a montage scene.

Comăneci became a naturalized US citizen in 2001, while retaining her Romanian citizenship. In 2006, the couple's son Dylan was born.

She was the featured speaker at the 50th annual Independence Day Naturalization Ceremony on July 4, 2012, at Monticello, the first athlete invited to speak in the history of the ceremony. In October 2017, an area in the Olympic Park in Montreal was renamed "Place Nadia Comaneci" in her honor.

Leadership roles

Comăneci is a well-known figure in the world of gymnastics; she serves as the honorary president of the Romanian Gymnastics Federation, the honorary president of the Romanian Olympic Committee, the sports ambassador of Romania, and as a member of the International Gymnastics Federation Foundation. She and Conner own the Bart Conner Gymnastics Academy, the Perfect 10 Production Company, and several sports equipment shops, and are the editors of International Gymnast Magazine.

She is also still involved with the Olympic Games. During the 2004 Summer Olympics in Athens, one of her perfect-10 Montreal uneven bars routines was featured in a commercial for Adidas. In addition, both Comăneci and her husband Bart Conner provided television commentary for the 2008 Summer Olympics in Beijing. A few years later, on July 21, 2012, Comăneci, along with former basketball star John Amaechi, carried the Olympic torch to the roof of the O2 Arena as part of the torch relay for the 2012 Summer Olympics in London. Prior to the 2016 Summer Olympics in Rio de Janeiro, Comăneci appeared in a TIDE advertisement called "The Evolution of Power" with Simone Biles and three-time Olympic gymnast Dominique Dawes. She also offered daily analysis of the 2016 games (along with other Olympic champions such as  Mark Spitz, Carl Lewis, and Conner), for the late-night show É Campeão, broadcast on Brazil's SporTV.

In addition, Comăneci is highly involved in fundraising for a number of charities. She personally funded the construction and operation of the Nadia Comăneci Children's Clinic in Bucharest that provides low-cost and free medical and social support to Romanian children. In 2003, the Romanian government appointed her as an honorary consul general of Romania to the United States to deal with bilateral relations between the two nations. In addition, both Comăneci and Conner are involved with the Special Olympics.

To raise money for charity, Comăneci participated in  Donald Trump's reality show, The Celebrity Apprentice, season seven. Comăneci was a member of "The Empresario" team (all women), which lost to "The Hydra" team (all men) in the second episode. Trump responded to this loss by firing Comăneci, thwarting her plan for raising money.  Comăneci later commented on her participation in the show, saying she "had great fun. I only did it because it was all for charity."

Honors and awards
 1975 and 1976: The United Press International Athlete of the Year Award
 1976: Hero of Socialist Labour
 1976: Associated Press Athlete of the Year
 1976: BBC Overseas Sports Personality of the Year
 1983: The Olympic Order
 1990: International Women's Sports Hall of Fame
 1993: International Gymnastics Hall of Fame
 1998: Marca Leyenda
 1998: Flo Hyman Award
 2004: The Olympic Order
 2016: Great Immigrant Honoree: Carnegie Corporation of New York
 2017: She was recognized as one of the BBC's 100 women of 2017.
 2021: Order of the Star of Romania, Grand Officer

Skills 

Comăneci was known for her clean technique, innovative and difficult original skills, and her stoic, cool demeanor in competition. On the balance beam, she was the first gymnast to successfully perform  an aerial cartwheel-back handspring series. She is also credited as being the first gymnast to perform a double-twist dismount. Her skills on the floor exercise included a tucked double back salto and a double twist.

Comăneci has two eponymous uneven bars skills listed in the Code of Points, the Comăneci salto and the Comăneci dismount.

Competitive history

Book and films
 Comăneci's 2004 memoir, Letters to a Young Gymnast, is part of the Art of Mentoring series by Basic Books.
 Katie Holmes directed a short 2015 documentary for ESPN about Comăneci entitled Eternal Princess that premiered at the Tribeca Film Festival.
 In 2016, Arte France produced a Pola Rapaport documentary about Comăneci entitled Nadia Comăneci, la gymnast et le dictateur (Nadia Comăneci: The Gymnast and the Dictator).
 In 1984, Comăneci was the subject of a biopic television film, Nadia. The film was developed without her involvement (although the content was described to her by others). She later stated publicly that the producers never made contact with her: "I sincerely don't even want to see it; I feel so badly about it. It distorts my life so totally."
 In 2012, Universal Pictures chose Comăneci to dub Granny Norma in Romanian in the animated movie The Lorax.
 In 2021, Stejărel Olaru published in Romanian a biographical volume, Nadia și Securitatea (Nadia and the Securitate), at Epica Publishing House.

See also 

 List of multiple Olympic gold medalists
 List of Olympic female gymnasts for Romania
 List of Olympic medal leaders in women's gymnastics
 List of multiple Olympic medalists at a single Games
 List of multiple Summer Olympic medalists

References

Citations

Cited sources

Further reading

External links 

 
 
 
 Voices of Oklahoma interview with Bart Conner. First person interview conducted on February 28, 2013, with Bart Conner, husband of Nadia Comăneci.

Video clips:
 Nadia Comăneci makes history at the Montreal 1976 Olympics – The Olympic Channel, 2010
 Nadia Comăneci – First Olympics Perfect 10 (Uneven Bars)- Montreal 1976 Olympics – The Olympic Channel, 2015
 Nadia Comăneci – Selections from all of her routines – Montreal 1976 Olympics (overview) – The Olympic Channel, 2012
 The Adorable Way This Olympic Couple First Met | Where Are They Now | Oprah Winfrey Network – Oprah Winfrey Network (U.S. TV channel), 2016
 Nadia Comaneci & Bart Conner Commentate on Their Perfect Olympic Routines | Take the Mic – The Olympic Channel, 2016
 Nadia Comaneci and Bart Conner, 11 Olympic Medals in this Olympic Family – The Olympic Channel, 2016

1961 births
Living people
BBC 100 Women
Defectors to the United States
Gymnasts at the 1976 Summer Olympics
Gymnasts at the 1980 Summer Olympics
Medalists at the 1976 Summer Olympics
Medalists at the 1980 Summer Olympics
Medalists at the World Artistic Gymnastics Championships
Olympic bronze medalists for Romania
Olympic gold medalists for Romania
Olympic silver medalists for Romania
Olympic gymnasts of Romania
Originators of elements in artistic gymnastics
People from Onești
People of the Cold War
People with acquired American citizenship
Recipients of the Olympic Order
Romanian defectors
Romanian emigrants to the United States
Romanian female artistic gymnasts
Romanian gymnastics coaches
Special Olympics
Universiade medalists in gymnastics
World champion gymnasts
BBC Sports Personality World Sport Star of the Year winners
Universiade gold medalists for Romania
Olympic medalists in gymnastics
The Apprentice (franchise) contestants
Participants in American reality television series
Medalists at the 1981 Summer Universiade
European champions in gymnastics